The Diocese of San Pablo (Latin: Dioecesis Sancti Pauli in Insulis Philippinis, Filipino: Diyosesis ng San Pablo, Spanish: Diócesis de San Pablo) is a Roman Catholic diocese which is a suffragan of the Archdiocese of Manila. Its patron saint or titular is Paul the First Hermit, the only one in the world dedicated to him.

Location
The diocese covers the entire province of Laguna. It is bordered southwest by the Archdiocese of Lipa in Batangas, north by the Diocese of Antipolo in Rizal and Laguna de Bay, west by the Diocese of Imus in Cavite, east by the Prelature of Infanta and southeast by the Diocese of Lucena in Quezon, and northwest by the Diocese of Parañaque in Metro Manila.

Ordinaries

History
The seed of Christianity was planted first in the town of Majayjay in 1571, as Augustinian missionaries were in the place and made contact with the natives. Augustinian priests in 1586 erected a parish known as the "Parish of San Pablo delos Montes". It was until 1578 when the Franciscan Apostolic Province of San Gregorio Magno was established in the Philippines and in Laguna. The two missionaries Padre Juan de Plasencia and Padre Diego de Oropesa founded on that same year formal settlements of Lumbang (Lumban) and Pila to become their primary residencia. Later, now-Saint Peter Baptist, being the Minister Provinciale of the Franciscans in the Philippines, expanded further the establishment of parishes and pueblos, namely of Longos, Pakil, and San Antonio in 1587.

Several religious orders also took hold of parishes and lands, such as the Dominicans (in Binan, Santa Rosa, some in San Pedro and Calamba, even in Cabuyao), the Society of Jesus (in San Pedro and Calamba) and the Augustinians (San Pablo, Bay, and Los Banos; they were later succeeded by Franciscans).

During the Revolution, churches were sacked and its properties, looted; priests were either massacred or escaped or even arrested by the Katipunan. In order to fill the curate of souls, Filipino native priests took possession of these churches.

With the advent of the Americans, there came Masonic ideals in schools and societies. The Philippine Independent Church, known popularly as Aglipayans, took hold of their presence in some towns such as Santa Cruz and Nagcarlan.

To revitalize the Christian life of the faithful in Laguna, missionary activities were made by the Redemptorists and the Jesuits. Devotions to the Most Sacred Heart of Jesus, to the Blessed Virgin of Lourdes, Saint Therese of the Child Jesus, and Flores de Mayo were utilized and prospered in each barrio and towns. Apostolates attracted the local elites.

In 1917, a seminario menor was opened under the auspices of the priests of the Congregation of the Mission until 1941 in San Pablo City.

Until 1910, Laguna was part of the ecclesiastical jurisdiction of the Diocese (now Archdiocese) of Manila; thus, the Diocese of San Pablo was carved out from the newly constituted Diocese of Lipa. The new diocese was erected through the Apostolic Constitution Ecclesiarum per ampla on November 28, 1966, by Pope Paul VI.

Pedro Bantigue y Natividad was installed as its first bishop on April 18, 1967, and becoming its Bishop Emeritus in 1995 until his death in 2012. He was succeeded by Francisco San Diego in 1995 who was later transferred as first Bishop of the Diocese of Pasig. Following San Diego appointed as Bishop of Pasig, was succeeded by Leo M. Drona, a Salesian, in 2004. At present, the diocese is led by Buenaventura M. Famadico, who was installed as fourth Bishop of San Pablo on March 2, 2013.

Coat of arms 
On the superior [upper] section of the shield is a crow with a piece of bread in its beak. It symbolizes the providential feeding of Paul the First Hermit during his long sojourn in the desert. Each day, the crow brought a half piece of bread for his physical sustenance. When Anthony the Abbot discovered his presence and stayed for a while. The crow brought a whole loaf of bread to signify that God takes care of the needs of his two faithful servants.

On the inferior section of the shield is the nine blue and white circles and a blue lake. The nine blue and white circles represent the nine lakes that are found in the province of Laguna and the City of San Pablo. In San Pablo, the city of the Seven Lakes, we encounter the lakes of Sampaloc, Bunot, Palakpakin, Kalibato, Mohicap, Pandin and Yambo. The eighth circle represents the man-made Lake Caliraya, and the ninth circle represents the great freshwater lake La Laguna de Bae that gave the province its name.

The blue lake is the actual shape of the Laguna de Bae, the principal natural geographical formation that gave the province its name and forms the natural boundary between the province and the province of Rizal and Metro Manila. The diocese chose the words of Psalm 92:12: “Iustus ut Palma Florebit,” (and the just will flourish like the Palm tree) as its motto.

Feast day 
The feast day of the diocese is celebrated every January 15. The anniversary of the dedication of the cathedral is a day before the feast day, every January 14. For the cathedral itself, it is ranked with solemnity (I class; Double I class with common octave in the whole diocese), but for the parishes in its jurisdiction, it is celebrated with a rank of feast. The same principle goes with the feast of the patron the next day.

Seminaries
Because of the shortage of priests in the diocese, there have been several priests that were incardinated into the diocese. With Pedro Bantigue as the newly appointed bishop at that time, he established a seminary, following the canonical erection of the Diocese of San Pablo.

The San Pablo Minor Seminary was opened in 1968, but was eventually closed in 1981. In that same year, the major seminary of the diocese was established, namely, the Saint Peter's College Seminary, in order to stress the obedience of those under the diocese towards the See of Peter. It was inaugurated on July 6, 1981, under Elias O. Poblete.

The said seminary is currently located in Brgy. Concepcion, San Pablo City and serves as the philosophy college seminary of the diocese.  

The other seminary, the San Pablo Theological Formation House, is located in Tagaytay City, Cavite, serves as the formation house for the theology seminarians of the diocese. It was named after Saint Paul the Apostle, as it was formerly named after the patron of the diocese, Saint Paul the First Hermit.

See also
Roman Catholic churches in Laguna

References

External links

Catholic Hierarchy: Diocese of San Pablo
Official Website of the Diocese of San Pablo

San Pablo
San Pablo
Christian organizations established in 1966
Roman Catholic dioceses and prelatures established in the 20th century
San Pablo, Laguna
Religion in Laguna (province)